Naga cuisine is the traditional cuisine of the Naga people of Nagaland, India. It features meats and fish, which are often smoked, dried or fermented.

Overview  
The various Naga people have their own cuisines, but often exchange recipes. A typical Naga meal consists of Rice, a meat dish, one or two boiled vegetable dishes, and a chutney/pickle (Tathu). 
Rice is the main carbohydrate source in the Naga diet and this region produces a number of prized rice varieties, but rice is also imported into the region from other states.
Dried/smoked meat is a very important ingredient in Naga cuisine and has practical significance for sustenance farmers/foragers and hunters. Smoked meat is often kept for an entire year to provide food security for individual families.
Nagas tend to prefer boiled edible organic leaves and wild forage which makes up a large part of the diet of many Naga regions.

Naga food tends to be spicy and there are several different varieties of chillies in Nagaland. The most notable being Naga Morich and Bhut jolokia. 
The ginger used in the Naga cuisine is spicy, aromatic and is different from the common ginger. Garlic and ginger leaves are also used in cooking meat dishes. 
Sichuan pepper is also a popular spice used by the Nagas.

Dishes 

 Fermented bamboo shoots made from tender shoot of the Bamboo tree are often served with fish and pork. 
 Akhuni (axone), a fermented soybean product often served with smoked pork and beef, it's a Sema tribe delicacy. 
 Anishi are fermented taro leaves made into patties and then smoked over the fire or sun dried, it's an Ao tribe delicacy.
 Galho is a mix rice dish made from a mixture of rice, vegetables and various meats.
 Smoked meat produced by keeping the meat above a fire or hanging on the wall of the kitchen for anywhere between 1 day to 2 weeks or longer.
 Yongjack (Parkia speciosa?) are long treebeans often eaten roasted over coals, and are often traded in bunches.

References 

 Naga recipes from Naga Ethnic Cuisine - A Class of its Own, Naga Women Voluntary Association.
 

 
Culture of Nagaland
Northeast Indian cuisine
Indian cuisine by state or union territory
Burmese cuisine
Cuisine by ethnicity